Epiperipatus trinidadensis is a species of velvet worm in the Peripatidae family. Males of this species have 27 to 30 pairs of legs, usually 28; females have 28 to 31, usually 30. The type locality is in Trinidad.

References

Onychophorans of tropical America
Onychophoran species
Animals described in 1888